Llygad Gŵr (fl. 1268 or 1258 – c. 1293,) was a Welsh-language poet in the court of Llywelyn ap Gruffudd.

His surviving works are a sequence of five awdlau for Llywelyn and four poems that praise the dynasty of Powys Fadog.

In his poetry, he envisions Wales as a single united nation with Llywelyn as its head and supreme power: "the true king of Wales". This has been called "the most 'nationalist' poetry in Welsh before the days of Glyn Dwr".

Sources

J. Lloyd-Jones, 'The Court Poets of the Welsh Princes', Proceedings of the British Academy, 1948
P. I. Lynch, 'Court Poetry, Power and Politics' in The Welsh King and His Court pp. 167–190, edited by T. M. Charles-Edwards, Morfydd E. Owen and Paul Russell, University of Wales Press, Cardiff, 2000.

References

External links
 Llygad Gŵr, Oxford Dictionary of National Biography

13th-century Welsh poets
Year of death unknown
Year of birth unknown
Year of birth uncertain